Presidential elections were held in Cyprus on 7 February 1993, with a second round on 14 February. The result was a victory for  Glafcos Clerides of the Democratic Rally after he finished as runner-up behind George Vassiliou of the AKEL in the first round, a reverse of the 1988 elections. Voter turnout was 92.4% in the first round and 93.3% in the second.

Results

References

1993 in Cyprus
Cyprus
Presidential elections in Cyprus
February 1993 events in Europe